Pócsmegyer is a village on Szentendre Island in Pest county, Hungary.

References

Populated places in Pest County